The Stuyvesant Fish House is a brick and limestone Italianate mansion located at 25 East 78th Street, at the corner of Madison Avenue in New York City. It was constructed for railroad executive Stuyvesant Fish and designed by Stanford White of McKim, Mead and White in 1898.

In 2006, Michael Bloomberg bought the house to be the headquarters of Bloomberg Philanthropies.

References
Notes

Further reading
 
Miller, Sam. "The 1900 Stuyvesant Fish House - No. 25 East 78th Street" Daytonian in Manhattan (February 23, 2012)

Houses in Manhattan
Upper East Side
Gilded Age mansions
McKim, Mead & White buildings
Italianate architecture in New York City